Lee Hui-sol (born 27 August 1989) is a South Korean weightlifter. She competed in the women's +75 kg event at the 2016 Summer Olympics.

References

External links
 

1989 births
Living people
South Korean female weightlifters
Olympic weightlifters of South Korea
Weightlifters at the 2016 Summer Olympics
Place of birth missing (living people)
Weightlifters at the 2014 Asian Games
Universiade medalists in weightlifting
Weightlifters at the 2018 Asian Games
Universiade bronze medalists for South Korea
Asian Games competitors for South Korea
20th-century South Korean women
21st-century South Korean women